The Copa del Rey 2010-11 was the 75th edition of the Spanish basketball Cup. It was managed by the ACB and was played in Madrid, in the Palacio de los Deportes on February 10–13 2011.

Bracket

By the score of 60–68, FC Barcelona Bàsquet defeated Real Madrid Baloncesto and defended its 2010 title. Alan Anderson was named MVP of the tournament.

Quarterfinals

Semifinals

Final

External links
Copa del Rey Official Website

Copa del Rey de Baloncesto
2010–11 in Spanish basketball cups
2011 in Madrid